Saif Mohammed Al-Bishr (born 15 September 1983) is an Emarati footballer . He is a lift winger and sometimes plays forward. In July 2008 he was transferred to Al Ain FC For A Reported 12 million Dirhams making him the second  most expensive  player to be transferred in the UAE League the first being his teammate at Al Ain FC Abdullah Malallah for 15 million Dirhams. Saif made his first appearance in the UAE League back in 2004.

Club career

Al Ain FC
Saif was finally transferred to Al Ain FC in the summer of 2008, after a long negotiation period with his previous club Al-Shaab, Al Ain finally got the youngster for 15 million AED.

He played 5 matches in 2010 AFC Champions League.

International career
Mohammed has made several appearances for the senior United Arab Emirates national football team, including five qualifying matches for the 2010 FIFA World Cup.

Career statistics

Club

As of 23 September 2009

1Continental competitions include the AFC Champions League
2Other tournaments include the UAE Super Cup, UAE President Cup and Etisalat Emirates Cup

Honours

Club

Al Ain FC

Etisalat Emirates Cup: 2008/2009
UAE President Cup: 2008/2009
UAE Super Cup: 2009

References

External links

1983 births
Living people
Emirati footballers
Al-Shaab CSC players
Al Ain FC players
Al Dhafra FC players
Sharjah FC players
Khor Fakkan Sports Club players
2007 AFC Asian Cup players
UAE First Division League players
UAE Pro League players
Association football wingers
United Arab Emirates international footballers